The 2018 FIBA U18 Women's Asian Championship was the qualifying tournament for FIBA Asia at the 2019 FIBA U19 Women's Basketball World Cup. The tournament, which was also the 24th edition of the biennial competition, was held in Bangalore, India from 28 October to 3 November. The top four teams qualified and will represent FIBA Asia in the 2019 FIBA U19 Women's Basketball World Cup in Thailand.

By virtue of topping their respective groups in Division A at the end of the preliminary round, South Korea and Japan earlier booked their spots in the U19 "Worlds", while Australia and China subdued their opponents in the qualification to the semifinals-round to also clinch their spot in the following year's tournament.

China defeated their old rivals Japan in the Final for the fifth straight time, with a score of 89-76, to annex their fifth straight title and sixteenth championship overall. Meanwhile, Australia avenged their preliminary-round loss to South Korea, with a score of 75-58, in the Bronze Medal Match.

Venues

Qualified teams 
For Division A:
 Semifinalists of the 2016 FIBA Asia U18 Championship for Women:
 
 
 
 
 Qualifying round winners at the 2016 FIBA Asia U18 Championship for Women:
 
 
 Finalists from the 2017 FIBA U17 Women's Oceania Championship:
 
 

For Division B:
 The host nation, being relegated to Division B at the previous championship:
 
 Semifinalists from the 2017 FIBA U17 Women's Oceania Championship:
 
 
 Early registrants for the Division B slots from FIBA Asia:

Competition format
The sixteen participating teams will be divided into two divisions, Division A and Division B of eight teams each.

In each division, the eight participating teams are divided into two groups (A and B) of four teams each. 

Each team shall play all the other teams within its own group. The final stage standings will be established after the games for a total of twelve are all played. 

Teams that will finish first in each group will advance to the semifinal round, awaiting the winners of the qualification to semifinals round.

Teams that will finish second and third in each group will face the third-placed and second-placed team, respectively, in the other group within its own division for the qualification to semifinals round.

Winners of the qualification to semifinals round will face the outright semifinalists in the semifinal round. Losers will face each other for the fifth-sixth place classification round.

For the seventh-eighth place classification round, teams that will finish fourth in each group will face the other fourth-placed team in the other group within its own division. 

For Division A, all semifinalists will qualify to the 2019 FIBA U19 Women's Basketball World Cup.

The Champion team from Division B will be promoted to Division A for the next championship, replacing the eighth-placed team in Division A that will be relegated to Division B for the next championship.

Divisions 
Division A will include teams that won in the 2016 qualifying round and the semifinalists of the previous championship.

Included were, the FIBA World Rankings prior to the draw (as of 10 December 2016).

Squads

Division A

Preliminary round
The preliminary groups were announced on 11 October 2018 in Bengaluru, India.

Group A

Group B

Knockout round

Bracket

Seventh place game

Qualification to Semifinals

Fifth place game

Semifinals

Third place game

Final

Final standing

Division B
All times are local (UTC+05:30)

Preliminary round
The preliminary groups were announced on 11 October 2018 in Bengaluru, India.

Group A

Group B

Knockout round

Bracket

Seventh place game

Qualification to Semifinals

Fifth place game

Semifinals

Third place game

Final

Final standing

References

External links
 2018 FIBA Asia Under-18 Championship for Women

2018 Women U18
FIBA Asia Under-18 Championship for Women
Basketball
under
International basketball competitions hosted by India
Bask
FIBA Under-18 Women’s Asian Championship
FIBA Under-18 Women’s Asian Championship